Seamus may refer to:

 Séamus, a male first name of Gaelic origin

Film and television
 Seamus (Family Guy), a character on the television series Family Guy
 Seamus, a pigeon in Cats & Dogs: The Revenge of Kitty Galore
 Seamus McFly, a fictional Irish character from Back to the Future Part III (Marty McFly's Great Great Grandfather)
 M/V Seamus (934TXS), a space salvage freighter, and the primary setting for Archer season 10, "Archer: 1999"

Music
 "Seamus" (song), the fifth song on Pink Floyd's 1971 album Meddle

Other uses
 Society for Electro-Acoustic Music in the United States
 Seamus (dog), a dog belonging to U.S. presidential candidate Mitt Romney
 Seamus Finnigan, a character in Harry Potter  by J.K. Rowling
 Sheamus, Irish-born professional wrestler who has worked for WWE since 2009.

See also

 Sheamus (born 1978), Irish professional wrestler
 Shamus (disambiguation)